Shuanggui Temple is a Buddhist temple located in Jindai Town, Liangping District, Chongqing, China.

History
Shuanggui Temple was built as "Fuguo Temple" by an accomplished Chan master Poshan Haiming in 1653, in the 10th year of Shunzhi Emperor's reign during the Qing dynasty (1644–1911). Due to its two osmanthus fragrans trees, the temple is also known as "Shuanggui Temple" (Shuang means two, Gui means osmanthus fragrans).

During the Cultural Revolution, monks put statues of Buddhist and cultural relics into wooden box with Quotations from Chairman Mao Tse-tung posted outside.

In 1983, the temple was inscribed to the National Key Buddhist Temples in Han Chinese Area List by the State Council of China.

In 2013, it has been designated as a "Major National Historical and Cultural Sites in Chongqing" by the State Council of China.

Architecture
The extant buildings of Shuanggui Temple include the Shanmen, Mahavira Hall, Maitreya Hall, Dabei Hall (Hall of Great Compassion), Ordination Hall, Five Hundred Arhats Hall and Buddhist Texts Library.

Mahavira Hall
The Mahavira Hall was first built in 1653 by Chan master Poshan, and underwent three renovations, respectively in 1758, 1822 and 1889. Statues of Sakyamuni, Ananda and Kassapa Buddha are enshrined in the middle of the hall. The statues of Eighteen Arhats, Manjushri and Samantabhadra stand on both sides of the hall.

Five Hundred Arhats Hall
The Five Hundred Arhats Hall enshrines five hundred life-like arhats with different looks and manners. It was built in 1998.

References

External links

Buddhist temples in Chongqing
Buildings and structures in Chongqing
Tourist attractions in Chongqing
1661 establishments in China
17th-century Buddhist temples
Religious buildings and structures completed in 1661